Antwuane Ponds (born June 29, 1975) is a former American football linebacker in the National Football League for the Washington Redskins.  He played college football at Syracuse University and was drafted in the seventh round of the 1998 NFL Draft with the 206th overall pick.

1975 births
Living people
American football linebackers
Syracuse Orange football players
Washington Redskins players